Barry Pullman is an American television writer and television producer.

His credits include Against the Law, Twin Peaks, Nightmare Cafe, Reasonable Doubts, Hercules: The Legendary Journeys, Cracker, Bloodline, Roswell, Saved and New Amsterdam, he was also a producer on the latter three series .

References

External links

American television producers
American television writers
American male television writers
Living people
Place of birth missing (living people)
Year of birth missing (living people)